"Walk Em Down (Don't Kill Civilians)" is a song by American record producer Metro Boomin and Atlanta-based rapper 21 Savage from the former's second studio album Heroes & Villains (2022). It features Canadian poet and singer Mustafa the Poet and was produced by Metro, Honorable C.N.O.T.E., Peter Lee Johnson and Simon on the Moon.

Composition
The song contains audio from Gucci Mane's 2007 documentary Hood Affairs. Over "sinister"-sounding piano keys in his signature horrorcore style and an "icy, monotone delivery", 21 Savage lyrically depicts gun and street violence and his determination to retaliate against the opposition. Midway through, the production shifts to a piano-backed, choir-lined instrumental, over which Mustafa sings about the trauma and turmoil that occurs as a result of the violence.

Critical reception
The song received generally positive reviews. Hamza Riaz of Mic Cheque considered it one of the "bone-chilling cuts" from Heroes & Villains, although also an example of which "When there is a new voice, they are shoehorned onto a disconnected strand of a track that would've benefited without it". Wongo Okon of Uproxx commented that Metro Boomin "shines as a conductor" in the song. Complex's Peter A. Berry regarded the hook (performed by 21 Savage) as "simple, yet symbolic enough to be anthemic". Slant Magazine's Charles Lyons-Burt was favorable toward the song spotlighting a lesser-known artist (Mustafa), writing that through this approach, "the album might have felt a bit less redundant with 2018's Not All Heroes Wear Capes, which featured many of the same artists."

Charts

References

2022 songs
Metro Boomin songs
21 Savage songs
Songs written by Metro Boomin
Songs written by 21 Savage
Song recordings produced by Metro Boomin